was a Japanese seinen manga magazine published on a monthly basis by Futabasha. It was launched as a special issue of Weekly Manga Action but became its own independent monthly anthology. The magazine was first published on 2 March 2004 as the industry's first shōjo manga magazine for males; the official website describes the magazine as "Girlish comics for boys and girls." The magazine is aimed at males between 18 and 35 years old. The final issue of the magazine was published in May 2015.

Manga serialized
15-sai
Aitama
Akatsuki-iro no Senpuku Majo
BadeMayo
Caterpillar & Butterfly
Chu-Bra!!
Devil na Ebiru
Dysmatopia
Fujoshi Rumi
Gakuen Polizi
Girl Friends
High School Girls
Hitohira
Hon Uru Shōjo
I Don't Like You at All, Big Brother!!
Kodomo no Jikan
MachiMachi
Mii-tan
Miman Renai
My Big Family
Potemayo
Oniichan Control
Over Drive Girl 1/6
Sora☆Miyo
TsubuLala
Ufu Ufu Fuufu
Umi Monogatari

References

External links
 

2004 establishments in Japan
2015 disestablishments in Japan
Defunct magazines published in Japan
Futabasha
Magazines established in 2004
Magazines disestablished in 2015
Magazines published in Tokyo
Monthly manga magazines published in Japan
Seinen manga magazines